Huaishang is a district of the city of Bengbu, Anhui Province, China.

Administrative divisions
In the present, Huaishang District has 1 subdistrict, 3 towns and 1 township.
1 Subdistrict
 Huaibin Subdistrict

3 Towns
 Xiaobengbu
 Wuxiaojie
 Caolaoji

1 Township
 Meiqiao

References

Bengbu